Lorentz Creutz (16151 June 1676) was a Swedish friherre (roughly equivalent to a baron), government administrator, county governor (landshövding) of Kopparberg County (1655–62), member of the Privy Council and supreme commander of the Swedish navy for a few months in 1676.

He successfully served as an administrator in the Treasury in later years and was appointed as navy commander in early 1676 during the Scanian War. However, his complete lack of naval military experience combined with the generally poor state of the Swedish fleet led to his death on Kronan, the flagship of the navy, at the battle of Öland on 1 June 1676.

Creutz married the friherrinna (roughly baroness) Elsa Duwall (1620–1675), daughter of general Jakob MacDougall (ennobled as "Duvall") and Anna von der Berge.

Children

Carl Gustaf Creutz

Sources 
Svensk uppslagsbok. Malmö 1931.
Den introducerade svenska adelns ättartavlor, Gustaf Elgenstierna

See also
Creutz family

1615 births
1676 deaths
Swedish admirals
Lorentz the elder
Governors of Västerbotten County
Deaths due to shipwreck at sea
Place of birth missing
17th-century Swedish military personnel
17th-century Swedish politicians